Interstate 35W (I-35W), an Interstate Highway, is the western half of I-35 where it splits to serve the Dallas–Fort Worth metropolitan area. I-35 splits into two branch routes, I-35W and I-35E, at Hillsboro. It runs through Fort Worth before rejoining with I-35E to reform I-35 in Denton. It is the more direct route for long-distance expressway traffic, as is noted on signs on I-35 leading into the I-35W/I-35E splits. During the 1970s, billboards existed on I-35 encouraging travelers to take the faster and shorter I-35W route.

During the early years of the Interstate Highway System, branching Interstates with directional suffixes, such as N, S, E, and W, were common nationwide. On every other Interstate nationwide, these directional suffixes have been phased out by redesignating the suffixed route numbers with a loop or spur route number designation (such as I-270 in Maryland, which was once I-70S) or, in some cases, were assigned a different route number (such as I-76, which was once I-80S). In the case of I-35 in the Dallas–Fort Worth area, since neither branch is clearly the main route and both branches return to a unified Interstate beyond the cities of Dallas and Fort Worth, officials at the American Association of State Highway and Transportation Officials (AASHTO) have allowed the suffixes of E and W in Texas to remain in the present day. I-35 also splits into I-35E and I-35W in Minneapolis–Saint Paul, Minnesota, for similar reasons as the I-35 split in the Dallas–Fort Worth area.

Route description

I-35 splits into two separately named Interstate Highways just north of Hillsboro, Texas. The routes fork to the northwest and northeast, with I-35W taking the northwest route and I-35E traveling off to the northeast toward Dallas. I-35W travels northwest past the Hillsboro airport through generally rolling farm and ranchlands. It then intersects with U.S. Highway 67 (US 67, East Henderson Street) on the west side of Alvarado. It continues northwest into the southern edge of Fort Worth. At an intersection with State Highway 174 (SH 174, Northeast Wilshire Boulevard), the route turns due north into greater Fort Worth, passing just west of Fort Worth Spinks Airport. Further north, the road reaches a five-level interchange with I-20. The route continues north, reaching downtown Fort Worth. Here, it reaches intersections with I-30, US 287, and US 377/SH 121 (East Belknap Street). I-35W travels north away from downtown concurrent with US 287, next intersecting I-820 just east of Fort Worth Meacham International Airport. Just north of this intersection, US 287 splits to the northwest, along with the southern terminus of US 81. I-35W then gradually shifts to the northeast, passing Fort Worth Alliance Airport and Texas Motor Speedway. It reaches its northern merging point on the southwest side of Denton, merging back together with I-35E to reform I-35, which continues off to the north. Like the I-35 split in Minneapolis–Saint Paul, Minnesota, I-35W uses its own exit numbers and mileposts, while I-35E continues those along I-35 between the city of Laredo and the Oklahoma state line.

History

When first designated, I-35W and I-35E were the only "suffixed" highways in Texas. Subsequently, I-69W, I-69E, and I-69C have been designated. 

In May 2014, construction began to build two-lane express lanes from the US 287/SH 280 interchange to North Tarrant Parkway. On August 2018, construction was completed.

Exit list

See also

References

External links

Interstate Guide: I-35E & I-35W (Texas)

35W
35W
W (Texas)
Transportation in Fort Worth, Texas
Transportation in Denton County, Texas
Transportation in Hill County, Texas
Transportation in Johnson County, Texas
Transportation in Tarrant County, Texas